Kitsada Thongkhen (born 8 April 1987) is a Laotian footballer. He made his first appearance for the Laos national football team in 2004.

International goals

References 

1987 births
Living people
Laotian footballers
Laos international footballers
Association football defenders